Running with the Devil is a 2019 American crime thriller film written and directed by Jason Cabell and starring Nicolas Cage, Laurence Fishburne, Leslie Bibb and  Barry Pepper. It is Cabell's directorial debut.

It was released in the United States on September 20, 2019, by Quiver Distribution and Redbox Entertainment.

Plot

A tenacious federal agent follows the supply line of a group of experienced cocaine dealers, from its origins on the farm, through the smugglers and cartel bosses, to corrupt officials, and the DEA trying to bring them down. As the CEO of an international conglomerate sends two of his most regarded executives to investigate why shipments of cocaine are being hijacked and over cut somewhere along the supply chain.

Cast
Nicolas Cage as The Cook
Laurence Fishburne as The Man
Leslie Bibb as Agent In Charge
Barry Pepper as The Boss
Adam Goldberg as The Snitch
Clifton Collins Jr. as The Farmer
Cole Hauser as The Executioner
Peter Facinelli as Number One
Natalia Reyes as The Woman
Marie Wagenman as The Child
Christian Tappan as Trey
Camilo Amores as Young Man

Production
Filming began in Albuquerque, New Mexico on March 13, 2018, then moved to Bogotá, Colombia on April 2 and wrapped on April 18.

Reception
On Metacritic, the film has a weighted average rating of 42 out of 100, based on 7 critics, indicating "mixed or average reviews".

References

External links
 

2019 films
2019 action thriller films
2019 crime thriller films
2019 directorial debut films
American action thriller films
American crime thriller films
Films set in Colombia
Films shot in New Mexico
Quiver Distribution films
2010s English-language films
2010s American films